Huangxing Road is a station on Shanghai Metro Line 8. It began operation on December 29, 2007.

References

Railway stations in Shanghai
Shanghai Metro stations in Yangpu District
Railway stations in China opened in 2007
Line 8, Shanghai Metro